Hebard is a surname. Notable people with the surname include:

 Arthur F. Hebard (born 1940), Professor of Physics at University of Florida
 Caroline Hebard (1944–2007), dog trainer
 Emory A. Hebard (1917–1993), Vermont businessman and politician
 Grace Raymond Hebard (1861–1936), Wyoming historian, suffragist, pioneering scholar and prolific writer
 Morgan Hebard (1887-1946), entomologist
 Ruthy Hebard (born 1998), American basketball player
 William Hebard (1800–1875), United States Representative from Vermont

Places
 Hebards, Michigan (also spelled Hebard), an unincorporated community

See also
 Ben Hebard Fuller (1870–1937), major general in the United States Marine Corps
 George Hebard Williamson (1872–1936), American architect
 Alfred Hebard House, a historic residence located in Red Oak, Iowa, United States
 Hebard – Ford Summer House, a private house located north of L'Anse in Pequaming, Michigan